TYN may stand for:

 Taiyuan Wusu International Airport (IATA code)
 Traditionalist Youth Network, an ideological group in the United States of America

See also 
 Tyn (disambiguation)